KVTK (1570 kHz, "ESPN Radio 1570") is an AM radio station broadcasting a sports talk format. Licensed to Vermillion, South Dakota, United States. The station is currently owned by 5 Star Communications, Inc. KVTK is affiliated with the ESPN Radio network, the CBS Sports Radio network, the Westwood One network, the Minnesota Lynx, the Minnesota Timberwolves and the Minnesota Wild.

The Station also airs Vermillion High School events and select University of South Dakota women's basketball games.

History
The station was assigned the KOSZ call letters on 1990-04-16.  On 2000-04-04, the station changed its call sign to the current KVTK.

Honors and awards
In May 2006, KVTK won one first place plaque in the commercial radio division of the South Dakota Associated Press Broadcasters Association news contest. The contest was for the 2005 calendar year.

References

External links

VTK
ESPN Radio stations
CBS Sports Radio stations
Radio stations established in 1967
1967 establishments in South Dakota